Ryan Daniel Dobson (born December 31, 1980) is a writer, actor,
photographer and director. His work includes the feature film Hosea
several short films including The Romantics, and the podcast The Thicket.

Biography
Ryan Daniel Dobson was born in Colorado where he graduated from Monte Vista High School in 1999. He then went on to graduate from Southern Nazarene University in Oklahoma City with a degree in Theology. He worked the following two years at Casady School in Oklahoma City as Chaplain with Father John Henry Marlin. Ryan moved to Los Angeles in October 2005 to begin his film and television career where he continues to live and work with his wife Sarah Elizabeth Dobson and two children.

Career
Ryan wrote and directed the feature film
Hosea (2019),
a modern retelling of the Biblical myth through the eyes of the
lesser-known character of the prophet's spouse.

Ryan wrote, directed, and acted in the short film
The Romantics (2014),
which pits two lovers against each other in ever-increasing self-imposed
dares of kitschy romance. The film appeared in the Woods Hole Film Festival,
winning the Audience Award for Best Comedy.

Ryan wrote and co-directed (with Patrick Cavanaugh) the short film
Prattle (2011),
about two competitive and egotistical friends who make a bet to see which can meet
and successfully propose to a woman online. The film appeared
in the Napa Valley Film Festival,
Bel Air Film Festival,
Manhattan Film Festival and
Cambridge Film Festival, as well as on Virgin Atlantic.

Ryan has co-starred on
The Protector (2011),
Castle (2010),
How I Met Your Mother (2010) and
The Game (2009).
His film acting career includes supporting roles in
The Trivial Pursuits of Arthur Banks (2011) and
The Order of Chaos (2010).
Early in his acting career he was involved in Oklahoma City’s Shakespeare productions.

References

External links
 
 
 The Thicket Podcast
 Production Company Small Group Films

American male actors
1980 births
Living people
Writers from Fort Collins, Colorado
Film directors from Colorado